Cecilia Omaile Ojabo (born in 1960) is the former Commissioner of Health and Human Services in Benue State, Nigeria. She was sworn in by Governor Samuel Ortom in 2015. She is also an Associate Professor of Ophthalmology at the Benue State University Teaching Hospital (BSUTH). As a Commissioner she worked towards improving healthcare in rural areas of Benue State. She also worked towards making hospitals more functional; increasing number of medical staff; and getting rid of polio infection and cholera outbreaks in the entire state.
 
She attended Saint Francis Primary School, Otukpo, Nigeria, from 1965 to 1971, and proceeded to the Government Girls Secondary School, Shendam, Nigeria, where she graduated with a West African School Certificate in 1976. She got her medical degree from the University of Benin (Nigeria) in 1985. She has worked in a number of hospitals in Nigeria and Scotland.

She is a Fellow of the West African College of Surgeons.

Her term as a Commissioner came to an end in 2018.

References

1960 births
Living people
People from Benue State
University of Benin (Nigeria) alumni
Nigerian ophthalmologists
Nigerian women medical doctors
Nigerian women academics
Academic staff of Benue State University